Brihadeeswarar temple fire is a fire accident that occurred during the consecration of the Brihadeeswarar Temple on 7 June 1997 in Thanjavur, Tamil Nadu, India. The accident was caused by a spark that caught up the thatch. A stampede occurred due to the panic created, and a total of 48 people were killed and left more than 200 people injured. It is believed a fire cracker lit near the temple fell on the yagasala, a temporary structure built to accommodate the ritual ceremonies, and sparked the fire that spread to the thatched roofs. A stampede resulted when the panic-stricken devotees rushed the only entrance to the temple on the eastern side.

The rescue operations were monitored by Pulavar Senguttuvan, the state Minister for Hindu Religious and Charitable Endowments, T N Ramanathan, the District Collector, S K Dogra, the Deputy Inspector-General of Police and Jayanth Murali, Superintendent of Police of Thanjavur district at that time. The rescue operations were aided by Home Guards, member of Red Cross and the general public. The Tamil Nadu Government announced a compensation of Rs 100,000 to the families of the deceased and the injured were paid from Rs 10,000 to Rs 50,000 each.

The temple

Brihadeeswara Temple, also called Big Temple, is a Hindu temple dedicated to Shiva and built by Raja Raja Chola I in Tamil architecture in 1010 AD, in his capital city Thanjavur. The temple is part of UNESCO World Heritage Site and "Great Living Chola Temples". The Kumbam (Kalasha or Chikharam) Vimanam (apexex or the bulbous structure on the top) of the temple is carved out of a single stone and it weighs around 80 tons. It is an architectural exemplar showcasing the pure form of the Dravida type of temple architecture and representative of the Chola Empire ideology and the Tamil civilisation in Southern India. The temple "testify to the brilliant achievements of the Chola in architecture, sculpture, painting and bronze casting."

The incident

During the consecration (Kumbhabhishekham) ceremony of 1997, 48 people were killed in a fire accident and 86 others injured. The incident occurred hours before the Mahakumbabishekam ceremony. It was reported that as many as 120 priests were performing the holy ceremonies in the temple. It is believed a fire cracker lit near the temple fell on the yagasala, a temporary structure built to accommodate the ritual ceremonies, and sparked the fire that spread to the thatched roofs. A stampede resulted when the panic-stricken devotees rushed to the only entrance to the temple on the eastern side. However, another version claimed the fire was caused by a spark from the electric generator. Most of the deaths were reported be caused by the inhalation of carbon monoxide and a few due to burn injuries. There were lot of inflammable material like ghee, camphor (karpooram) used in religious ceremonies, condiments and thatched roof that resulted in spreading of fire. The only entrance was the narrow eastern side where many rushed and fell on stones. Police reported that they recovered 37 bodies from the thatched roof that fell on the worshipers. The fire hampered the electric line in the neighbourhood, slowing down the rescue operations.

The rescue operations were monitored by Pulavar Senguttuvan, the state Minister for Hindu Religious and Charitable Endowments, T N Ramanathan, the District Collector, S K Dogra, the Deputy Inspector-General of Police and Jayanth Murali, Superintendent of Police of Thanjavur district at that time. The rescue operations were aided by Home Guards, member of Red Cross and the general public. A special information cell was opened in the premises of the temple and also at Collector's office.

Aftermath
The accident was one of four major fire accidents in the state along with the fire accidents like the Erwadi fire incident on 6 August 2001 that killed 30 mentally challenged people, fire at marriage hall on 23 January 2004 at Srirangam where 30 people including the bridegroom were killed and 2004 Kumbakonam School fire where 94 school children were killed. The Tamil Nadu Government announced a compensation of Rs 100,000 to the families of the deceased and the injured were paid from Rs 10,000 to Rs 50,000 each. The Deputy Inspector General (DGI), during the investigation, ruled out any possibility of sabotage even though an attempt was made to blast the TV relay station at Eswari Nagar the previous week.

References

Further reading

 
 

Fires in India
1997 in India
1990s in Tamil Nadu
1997 fires in Asia
Thanjavur district
Crime in Tamil Nadu
Building and structure fires started by pyrotechnics